Penarosa is an extinct genus from a well-known class of fossil marine arthropods, the trilobites. It lived during the Middle Cambrian (Ptychagnostus atavus Zone to Ptychagnostus punctuosus Zone), approximately 505 to 500 million years ago.

References

Ptychoparioidea
Ptychopariida genera
Cambrian trilobites of Australia